Epipagis lygialis is a moth in the family Crambidae. It is found on Borneo and Java.

References

Moths described in 1899
Spilomelinae
Moths of Indonesia
Moths of Borneo
Insects of Java